Land league may refer to:

 Irish National Land League
Highland Land League
 Statute league